Zervavra is a village located in Surat district, Gujarat, India.

See also 
List of tourist attractions in Surat

Suburban area of Surat
Villages in Surat district